The Majesty of the Blues is an album by jazz trumpeter Wynton Marsalis that was released in 1989.

Background
The first two selections on the album are played by the Wynton Marsalis Sextet.

The remaining three tracks (side B on the original LP release), a set entitled "New Orleans Function", feature the sextet  with additional New Orleans musicians in a style influenced by the traditional New Orleans brass band. This section mirrors a traditional jazz funeral, with a dirge-like first selection ("The Death of Jazz"), then a spoken word section ("Premature Autopsies", an essay by Stanley Crouch performed by Jeremiah Wright) and preached like a minister at a graveyard, and a second line number ("Oh, But on the Third Day – Happy Feet Blues").

Track listing

Personnel

The Wynton Marsalis Sextet
 Wynton Marsalis – trumpet
 Todd Williams – tenor and soprano saxophones
 Wessell Anderson – alto saxophone
 Marcus Roberts – piano
 Reginald Veal – double bass
 Herlin Riley – drums

The New Orleans Function
Composed of the Wynton Marsalis Sextet and the following:
 Wynton Marsalis – second trumpet and plunger mute
 Teddy Riley – first trumpet
 Freddie Lonzo – trombone
 Michael White – clarinet
 Danny Barker – banjo

Technical personnel
 Steven Epstein – producer
 George Butler – executive producer
 Tim Geelan – engineer
 Dennis Ferrante – assistant engineer

References

External links
 "The Majesty of the Blues" on WyntonMarsalis.org

1989 albums
Albums produced by George Butler (record producer)
Columbia Records albums
Wynton Marsalis albums